I'll Be There for You may refer to:

 I'll Be There for You (album), a 2001 album by KC and the Sunshine Band
 "I'll Be There for You" (Bon Jovi song), 1989
 "I'll Be There for You" (The Moffatts song), 1998
 "I'll Be There for You" (The Rembrandts song), 1995
"I'll Be There for You" (Solid HarmoniE song), 1997
 "I'll Be There for You"/"You're All I Need to Get By", a 1995 single by Method Man and Mary J. Blige
 "I'll Be There for You", a song by Backstreet Boys from the 1999 album Millennium
 "I'll Be There for You", a song by Black 'n Blue from the 1986 album Nasty Nasty
 "I'll Be There for You", a song by Primal Scream from the 1994 album Give Out But Don't Give Up
 "I'll Be There for You", a song by Caiphus Semenya from the 1978 album Herb Alpert / Hugh Masekela
"I'll Be There for You", a song by Donna De Lory from Songs 95

See also 
 "I Will Be There for You", a 1999 song by Jessica Andrews
 I'll Be There (disambiguation)
 There for You (disambiguation)